Fikri Demirel (born November 2, 1956) is a Turkish politician from the Justice and Development Party (AK Party) who serves as a Member of Parliament for the Yalova since 7 June 2015.

Early life and career 
Fikri Demirel was born on November 2, 1956 in Rize to Ali Demirel and his wife Sabire. He completed his primary and secondary education in Erzurum, and his high school education in Istanbul. Demirel graduated from Ankara Eğitim Enstitüsü. He is married and has two children.

Political career 
Demirel participated in the establishment of the Justice and Development Party (AK Party) Yalova branch. He became the provincial President of the AK Party's Yalova Branch in 2003, serving until 2007. He was elected as a Member of Parliament for the electoral district of Yalova in the June 2015 general election and was re-elected in the November 2015 general election.

See also 
 26th Parliament of Turkey

References 

Justice and Development Party (Turkey) politicians
21st-century Turkish politicians
1956 births
Living people
People from Rize
Deputies of Yalova